Kahukura Bentson (born 2 December 1978) is a New Zealand middleweight boxer. He has represented his country at the 2002 and 2006 Commonwealth Games.

External links
Index of newspaper articles relating to Kahukura Bentson

Living people
Middleweight boxers
1978 births
Boxers at the 2002 Commonwealth Games
Boxers at the 2006 Commonwealth Games
Commonwealth Games competitors for New Zealand
New Zealand male boxers
20th-century New Zealand people
21st-century New Zealand people